Dennis John Skotak (born 1943) is an American visual effects artist. In 1990 he won an Academy Award for Best Visual Effects for the film The Abyss, and was nominated for another three years later for Batman Returns.

Selected filmography 
 The Abyss (1989; co-won with John Bruno, Dennis Muren and Hoyt Yeatman)
 Batman Returns (1992; co-nominated with Michael L. Fink, Craig Barron and John Bruno)

References

External links 

1943 births
Living people
People from Detroit
Visual effects artists
Visual effects supervisors
Best Visual Effects Academy Award winners
Date of birth missing (living people)